Charles Augustus Zollinger (December 9, 1838 in Wiesbaden, German Confederation - December 27, 1893) was an American Civil War hero on the Union side, and later served six terms as Mayor of Fort Wayne, Indiana. As a Colonel in the Union Army, he led troops into battle at Murfreesboro, Shiloh, Franklin and Nashville. Born in Wiesbaden in the German Confederation to German parents of Swiss heritage, he emigrated along with his family in 1848, arriving in New York before settling in Sandusky, Ohio and soon after moving to Marion, near Fort Wayne, Indiana.

Zollinger, a Democrat, was first elected Mayor of Fort Wayne in 1873, and served until 1885. He was succeeded by Charles F. Muhler, a Republican. Zollinger returned for a sixth and final term in 1891, but died in office on December 27, 1893, and was succeeded by Henry P. Scherer.

See also
List of mayors of Fort Wayne, Indiana

References

1838 births
1893 deaths
German emigrants to the United States
American people of Swiss descent
Military personnel from Wiesbaden
German people of Swiss descent
Union Army officers